This is a list of Tennessee Confederate Civil War units. The list of Tennessee Union Civil War units is shown separately.

Infantry

 1st (Maney's/Field's) Tennessee Infantry
 Rock City Guards (Companies A, B and C)
 1st (Turney's) Tennessee Infantry (1st Regiment Provisional Army of Tennessee 1st Confederate Infantry)
 1st Tennessee Zouaves
 2nd (Robison's) Tennessee Infantry (Walker Legion)
 2nd (Walker's) Tennessee Infantry (5th Confederate Infantry; 9th Confederate Infantry; 5th Confederate Regiment, Tennessee Infantry)
 3rd (Clack's) Tennessee Infantry
 3rd (Vaughan's) Tennessee Infantry (Lillard's 3rd Cavalry, 3rd Mounted Infantry)
 4th Tennessee Infantry Regiment
 5th Tennessee Infantry Regiment
 6th Tennessee Infantry Regiment
 7th Infantry
 8th Infantry
 9th Tennessee Infantry Regiment
 10th Infantry
 11th Infantry
 12th Tennessee Infantry Regiment
 13th Tennessee Infantry Regiment
 14th Tennessee Infantry Regiment
 15th Tennessee Infantry Regiment
 16th Infantry
 17th Infantry
 18th Infantry
 19th Tennessee Infantry Regiment
 20th Tennessee Infantry Regiment
 21st Infantry
 22nd Tennessee Infantry Regiment (Freeman's Regiment)
 23rd Tennessee Infantry Regiment
 24th Tennessee Infantry Regiment
 25th Tennessee Infantry
 26th Tennessee Infantry (3d East Tennessee Volunteers)
 27th Tennessee Infantry Regiment
 28th Tennessee Infantry Regiment
 28th Tennessee Infantry (2nd Mountain Regiment, Volunteers)
 29th Infantry
 30th Infantry
 31st (Bradford's) Tennessee Infantry (39th Infantry, 39th Mounted Infantry)
 32nd Tennessee Infantry Regiment
 33rd Tennessee Infantry Regiment
 34th Infantry (4th Regiment Provisional Army of Tennessee, 4th Confederate Infantry)
 35th Tennessee Infantry Regiment (5th Regiment Provisional Army of Tennessee, 1st Mountain Rifle)
 36th Tennessee Infantry Regiment

 37th Tennessee Infantry Regiment (7th Regiment Provisional Army of Tennessee, 1st East Tennessee Rifle Regiment)
 38th Tennessee Infantry (8th Infantry, Looney's Regiment)
 39th (Avery's) Tennessee Infantry (4th Confederate Infantry)
 40th Tennessee Infantry (5th Confederate Infantry, Walker's Regiment, Volunteers)
 41st Infantry
 42nd Infantry
 43rd Tennessee Infantry (5th East Tennessee Volunteers, Gillespie's Regiment)
 44th Tennessee Infantry Regiment
 45th Tennessee Infantry Regiment
 46th Infantry
 47th Tennessee Infantry Regiment
 48th (Voorhies') Tennessee Infantry
 48th (Nixon's) Tennessee Infantry (48th (Voorhies')-54th Consolidated Infantry)
 49th Infantry
 50th Infantry
 51st Infantry
 52nd Tennessee Infantry Regiment
 53rd Infantry
 54th Infantry
 55th (Brown's) Tennessee Infantry Regiment
 55th (McKoin's) Tennessee Infantry
 56th Tennessee Infantry Regiment (46th-55th (Brown's) Consolidated Tennessee Infantry)
 59th Tennessee Infantry (1st (Eakin's) Tennessee Battalion; Cooke's Regiment; 59th Mounted Infantry)
 60th Tennessee Infantry Regiment (Crawford's Regiment, 60th Mounted Infantry, 79th Mounted Infantry)
 61st Infantry (Pitts' Regiment, 61st Mounted Infantry, 81st Infantry)
 62nd Infantry (Rowan's Regiment, 62nd Mounted Infantry, 80th Infantry)
 63rd Tennessee Infantry (Fain's Regiment, 74th Infantry)
 84th Infantry
 154th Senior Regiment, Tennessee Infantry (1st Tennessee Volunteers)
 Harman's Regiment, Tennessee Infantry
 1st (Colms') Battalion, Infantry
 3rd (Memphis) Battalion, Infantry
 22nd (Murray's) Battalion, Infantry
 23rd (Newman's) Battalion, Infantry
 24th Battalion, Infantry
 Crew's Battalion, Infantry
 Nashville (Hawkins') Battalion, Infantry
 Sowell's Detachment, Infantry
 Spencer's Company, Infantry
 Tackitt's Company, Infantry

Consolidated Infantry
 1st (Maney's/Feild's)-27th Consolidated Tennessee Infantry Regiment (25th Tennessee Infantry Regiment)
 2nd (Walker's)-21st Consolidated Tennessee Infantry Regiment (5th Confederate Infantry; 9th Confederate Infantry; 5th Confederate Regiment, Tennessee Infantry)
 3rd (Clack's)-18th-30th Consolidated Tennessee Infantry Regiment 
 4th-5th Consolidated Tennessee Infantry Regiment 
 6th-9th Consolidated Tennessee Infantry Regiment 
 8th-28th-84th Consolidated Tennessee Infantry Regiment 
 11th-29th Consolidated Tennessee Infantry Regiment 
 12th-22nd-47th Consolidated Tennessee Infantry Regiment
 13th-154th Consolidated Tennessee Infantry Regiment
 15th-37th Consolidated Tennessee Infantry Regiment (7th Regiment Provisional Army of Tennessee, 1st East Tennessee Rifle Regiment)
 17th-23rd Consolidated Tennessee Infantry Regiment
 25th-44th-55th (McKoin's) Consolidated Tennessee Infantry Regiment
 31st-33rd Consolidated Tennessee Infantry Regiment
 34th-24th (Btln) Consolidated Tennessee Infantry Regiment (4th Confederate Regiment, Tennessee Infantry)
 35th-48th (Nixon's) Consolidated Tennessee Infantry Regiment (temporary) (5th Regiment Provisional Army of Tennessee, 1st Mountain Rifle)
 45th-23rd (Btln) Consolidated Tennessee Infantry Regiment
 46th-55th (Brown's) Consolidated Tennessee Infantry Regiment (56th Tennessee Infantry)
 48th (Voorhies')-54th Consolidated Tennessee Infantry Regiment (48th (Nixon's) Infantry)
 49h-50th-7th (Texas) Consolidated Tennessee Infantry Regiment (temporary) (Bailey's Tennessee Infantry Regiment)
 50th-1st (Colms' Btln) Consolidated Tennessee Infantry Regiment
 51st-52nd Consolidated Tennessee Infantry Regiment
 1st Consolidated Regiment, Tennessee Infantry (1st-27th, 6th-9th, 8th-28th-84th and 16th Regiment and 34th-24th Sharpshooters)
 2nd Consolidated Regiment, Tennessee Infantry (11th-29th, 12th-22nd-47th, 13th-154th, 50th and 51st-52nd Regiments)
 3rd Consolidated Regiment, Tennessee Infantry (4th-5th, 19th, 24th, 31st-33rd, 35th, 38th and 41st Regiments and 22nd Battalion)
 4th Consolidated Regiment, Tennessee Infantry (5th Confederate, 3rd-18th-30th, 10th, 15th-37th, 20th, 26th and 32nd Regiments and 45th-23rd Btln)

Sharpshooters
24th (Maney's) Battalion, Sharp Shooters was Captain Frank Maney's Company, Light Artillery, which was organized September 7, 1861; surrendered at Fort Donelson; reorganized December 1, 1862 as light artillery, but armed temporarily as infantry. It fought in the Battle of Murfreesboro with the 1st (Feild's) Tennessee Infantry. It never was re-armed as artillery, but instead two companies, which had been organized in December 1862 were added to it, and it was formed into a battalion with the election of Captain Frank Maney as major. reorganized May 1, 1863; served as Sharpshooters for Maney's Brigade, Cheatham's Division, Army of Tennessee; as part of 1st Consolidated Tennessee Infantry Regiment.Regiment, commanded by Lieutenant Colonel Oliver A. Bradshaw. This regiment was surrendered and paroled at Greensboro, North Carolina, May 1, 1865.

Captains:
 Frank Maney, (to major) Hugh M. McAdoo, Co. "A". Organized September 7, 1861 from Humphreys County. Formerly Maney's Light Artillery, also called Humphreys Light Artillery.
 Robertson Garrett, Co. "B". Organized December 13, 1862 from Humphreys Countv. Reported to General George E. Maney at Shelbyville, January 5, 1863. The company was merged into the 1st Consolidated Tennessee Infantry Regiment on April 9, 1865 and became company H.
 John M. McAdoo, Co. "C". Organized December 16, 1862 from Humphreys County. Reported to General Maney at Shelbyville early in 1863.

Cavalry
 1st Confederate Cavalry Regiment (12th Confederate Cavalry Regiment)
 1st (Roger's) Cavalry ( 1st (Rogers') East Tennessee Cavalry Regiment; 2nd (MeLin's) Cavalry Regiment; 5th (McKenzie's) Cavalry)
 1st (Carter's) Cavalry
 2nd (Ashby's) Cavalry
 2nd (Smith's) Cavalry
 2nd/22nd (Barteau's) Tennessee Cavalry
 3rd (Forrest's Old) Cavalry
 3rd (Lillard's) Cavalry (3rd Mounted Infantry, 3rd (Vaughan's) Infantry)
 4th (McLemore's) Cavalry
 4th (Murray's) Cavalry * (8th (Smith's) Cavalry)
 5th (McKenzie's) Cavalry (1st (Roger's) Cavalry)
 6th (Wheeler's) Cavalry (1st Cavalry, 2nd Cavalry)
 7th (Jackson's/Stock's/Duckworth's) Cavalry (1st Cavalry)
 8th (Smith's) Cavalry (4th (Murray's) Cavalry)
 9th (Ward's/Bennett's) Cavalry (13th Cavalry, 15th Cavalry)
 10th (De Moss') Cavalry
 11th (Holman's) Cavalry
 12th (Richardson's/Green's) Cavalry (1st Partisan Rangers Regiment, 12th Partisan Rangers Regiment)
 13th (Dibrell's/Gore's) Cavalry (8th Cavalry)
 14th (Neely's) Cavalry (13th Cavalry)
 15th (Stewart's) Cavalry
 16th (Logwood's) Cavalry
 17th (Marshall's) Cavalry (16th Cavalry)
 18th (Newsom's) Cavalry (19th Cavalry)
 19th (Biffle's) Cavalry (9th Cavalry)
 20th (Russell's) Cavalry (15th Cavalry)
 21st (Carter's) Cavalry (Wheeler's Scouts)
 21st (Wilson's) Cavalry (16th Cavalry)
 22nd (Nixon's) Cavalry (20th Cavalry)
 28th (Hay's) Cavalry
 Collins' Regiment, Cavalry
 Franklin' Regiment, Cavalry
 Cooper's Regiment/Battalion, Cavalry
 1st (McNairy's) Battalion, Cavalry (1st West Tennessee Battalion, 1st Middle Tennessee Battalion)
 2nd (Biffle's) Battalion, Cavalry  (3rd Battalion, Jones' Battalion, Cox's 3rd Battalion)
 3rd (Brazleton's) Battalion, Cavalry (2nd Battalion, 5th Battalion)
 4th (Branner's) Battalion, Cavalry
 4th (Hamilton's) Battalion, Cavalry (4th Tennessee Cavalry Regiment, Shaw's Battalion)
 5th (McClellan's) Battalion, Cavalry
 6th (Logwood's) Battalion, Cavalry (1st Battalion)
 7th (Bennett's) Battalion, Cavalry
 9th (Gantt's) Battalion, Cavalry
 11th (Gordon's) Battalion, Cavalry (10th Battalion)
 12th (Day's) Battalion, Cavalry (Adrian's Partisan Ranger Battalion, Phipps' Battalion)
 16th (Neal's) Battalion, Cavalry (Rucker's Battalion)
 17th (Sander's) Battalion, Cavalry
 27th (Daniel's) Battalion, Cavalry
 Cox's Independent Battalion, Cavalry
 McCann's Battalion, Cavalry
 Napier's Battalion, Cavalry
 Spiller's Battalion, Cavalry
 Allison's Squadron, Cavalry
 Clark's (Captain) Independent Company, Cavalry
 Jackson's (Captain) Company, Cavalry (Gen. Forrest's Escort Company)
 Parton's Company, Cavalry
 Stone's Company A, Lyons Cavalry
 William's Company, Cavalry
 Woodward's Company, Cavalry

Consolidated
 10th-11th Consolidated Tennessee Cavalry Regiment
 15th-16th Consolidated Tennessee Cavalry Regiment
 19th-20th Consolidated Tennessee Cavalry Regiment
 21st-22nd (Barteau's) Consolidated Tennessee Cavalry Regiment

Mounted Infantry
 3rd Mounted Infantry (3rd (Vaughan's) Infantry, 3rd (Lilliard's) Cavalry)
 39th Mounted Infantry (31st (Bradford's) Infantry, 39th (Bradford's) Infantry)
 59th Mounted Infantry (Cooke's Regiment, 1st (Eakin's) Battalion, 59th Infantry)
 60th Mounted Infantry (Crawford's Regiment, 79th Infantry)
 61st Mounted Infantry (Pitts' Regiment, 81st Infantry)
 62nd Mounted Infantry (Rowan's Regiment, 80th Infantry)

Artillery

Heavy Artillery
 1st Tennessee Heavy Artillery (Jackson's Regiment)
 Company B, 1st Tennessee Heavy Artillery (McClung's Guards Artillery; Company A, 1st Tennessee Heavy Artillery)
 Company C, 1st Tennessee Heavy Artillery (Sterling's Company, Heavy Artillery)
 Company H, 1st Tennessee Heavy Artillery (Hoadley's Battery; Magruder Guards; Company D, 4th Arkansas Infantry Battalion)
 Company K, 1st Tennessee Heavy Artillery (Miller's Battery, Light Artillery; Pillow Flying Artillery)
 Company L, 1st Tennessee Heavy Artillery (Johnston's Company, Heavy Artillery; Southern Guards Artillery; Memphis Southern Guards)
 Lynch's Company, 1st Heavy Artillery Artillery (Lynch's Company, Light Artillery)
 A. P. Stewart’s Heavy Artillery Battalion
 Caruther's Battery, Heavy Artillery 
 Rice's Battery, Heavy Artillery (Rice's Battery, Light Artillery)

Light Artillery
 1st Light Artillery Regiment (Tennessee Artillery Corps)
 1st Light Artillery Battalion (1st Heavy Artillery Battalion)
 Monsarrat's Light Artillery Battalion
 Morton's Light Artillery Battalion
 Barry's Company, Light Artillery (Lookout Artillery)
 Baxter's (2nd) Company, Light Artillery
 Bibb's Company, Artillery (Washington Artillery; Company H, Tennessee Artillery Corps)
 Browne's Company, Light Artillery (Baker's Company)
 Burrough's Company, Light Artillery (Rhett Artillery)
 Crain's Battery, Light Artillery
 Fisher's Company, Artillery (Nelson Artillery; Battery G, 1st Light Artillery Regiment)
 Huggins' Company, Light Artillery (Baxter's 1st Company; Freeman's Horse Artillery, Company B, Monsarrat's Battalion)
 Kain's Company, Light Artillery (Mabry Light Artillery)
 Lynch's Company, Light Artillery (Lynch's Company, 1st Heavy Artillery Artillery)
 Maney's Company, Light Artillery (Humphrey's Battery; Company A, 24th Sharpshooter Battalion)
 Marshall's Company, Artillery (Steuben Artillery; Battery D, 1st Light Artillery Regiment)
 Marshall's Company, Artillery (Brown Horse Artillery)
 McClung's Company, Light Artillery (Caswell Artillery; Battery A, 1st Light Artillery Regiment)
 Miller's Battery, Light Artillery (Pillow Flying Artillery; Company K, 1st Heavy Artillery)
 Morton's Company, Light Artillery (Burns Light Artillery, Morton's Horse Artillery)
 Palmer's Company, Light Artillery (Reneau Battery)
 Phillips' Company, Light Artillery (Johnston Light Artillery)
 Polk's Battery, Light Artillery (Company G, Tennessee Artillery Corps)
 Ramsey's Battery, Artillery
 Rice's Battery, Light Artillery (Rice's Battery, Heavy Artillery)
 Rutledge's Battery, Light Artillery (Company A, Tennessee Artillery Corps)
 Scott's Company, Light Artillery (Company B, Tennessee Artillery Corps)
 Sparkman's Company, Light Artillery (Maury Artillery)
 Stewart's Company, Artillery (Company M, Tennessee Artillery Corps)
 Tobin's Company, Light Artillery (Memphis Light Battery, Tobin's Horse Artillery)
 Weller's Company, Light Artillery (Rock City Artillery; Battery B, 1st Light Artillery Regiment)
 Winson's Company, Light Artillery (Belmont Battery; Battery C, 1st Light Artillery Regiment)

Horse Artillery
 Freeman's Battery, Horse Artillery (Huggins' Company, Light Artillery; Baxter's 1st Company; Company B, Monsarrat's Battalion)
 Morton's Battery, Horse Artillery (Morton's Company, Light Artillery; Burns Light Artillery)
 Tobin's Battery, Horse Artillery (Tobin's Company, Light Artillery; Memphis Light Battery)
 White's Battery, Horse Artillery

Misc
 Conscripts, Tennessee
 Detailed Conscripts, Tennessee (Local Defense and Special)
 Engineers Corps, Tennessee
Pickett's Company, Sappers and Miners
 Miscellaneous, Tennessee
 Service Troops, Nitre and Mining Bureau

Legions
 1st East Tennessee Legion (Rucker's Legion)

Partisan Rangers
 Greer's Regiment, Partisan Rangers
 1st Regiment, Partisan Rangers (12th Partisan Rangers Regiment, 12th Cavalry)
 5th (Black's) Battalion, Partisan Rangers (Black's Battalion, Forrests Cavalry)
 Adrian's Battalion, Partisan Rangers (12th (Day's) Battalion, Cavalry; Phipps' Battalion)
 Douglass' Battalion, Partisan Rangers
 Holman's Battalion, Partisan Rangers

Militia
 121st Regiment, Militia

Local Defense Troops
 Blair's Company (Local Defense Troops)
 McLin's Company, Volunteers (Local Defense Troops)
 Miller's Company, (Local Defense Troops)
 Park's Company (Local Defense Troops)
 Sullivan County Reserves (Local Defense Troops)

See also
Lists of American Civil War Regiments by State
Confederate Units by State

Footnotes

Sources
 
 

 
Tennessee
Civil War Confederate Units